Shahril Anwar is the 13th commander of the Royal Brunei Air Force (RBAirF) from 2015 to 2018. Notably he was also the defense attaché of Brunei to Malaysia in 2010.

Education 
Throughout his career, he attended several institutes and training overseas including the Initial Officer Training (IOT) at the Royal Air Force College Cranwell, Lincolnshire, England in October 1986, the Qualified Helicopter Instructor (QHI) Course in the United Kingdom in 1999, the 4th Advanced Command & Staff Course (ACSC) at the Joint Services Command and Staff College, United Kingdom in July 2000, the Australia's Centre of Defence and Strategic Studies (ADDSS) at the Australian Defence College, Canberra, Australia in 2012.

Military career
In January 1986, he enlisted into the RBAF and commissioned into the No 1 Squadron, Operations Wing (present day No 11 Squadron, No 1 Wing). He would then be assigned to the No 4 Squadron (present day No 14 Squadron, 1 Wing) as the Flight Operations Commander. Upon returning from the UK, Colonel Shahril became the Squadron Commander of the No 4 Squadron in August 2001. In 2006, Shahril became the Commanding Officer (CO) of the Training Wing in the RBAirF, but before that he held the position of Staff Officer Grade 2 (SO2).

Returning from Australia in December 2012, the Colonel was assigned to the Directorate of Force Capability Development as their Director, and later became the RBAirF's deputy commander on 18 December 2014, under the command of Wardi Abdul Latip. Finally on 25 September 2015, the handover ceremony of the command of RBAirF between Wardi Abdul Latip and Shahril Anwar was held at Rimba Air Force Base, Bandar Seri Begawan. His newly appointed position would only be effective on that following day and become the 13th commander of the branch. The ceremony was attended by service and family members followed bt defense advisers of several other countries.

On 9 January 2016, Commander Shahril noted that the RBAirF was lacking in manpower and require more people to enlist to replace retired or overworked servicemen. He persuaded both men and women to enlist and announced that the Sikorsky S-70i and Pilatus PC-7 flight simulators are expected to arrive in Brunei later that year. Shahril Anwar with the consent of Sultan Hassanal Bolkiah, was promoted to the rank of Brigadier General on 27 May 2016. Commander Shahril handed over the national flag of Brunei to Major Amierul Halpi Talip, CO of the 238 Squadron, No 2 Wing, prior to their departure to take part in the 23rd Exercise Airguard from 28 August to 11 September 2017. On 18 August 2018, he would then be succeeded by Hamzah Sahat as the 14th commander.

Later life 
At a request by Sultan Hassanal Bolkiah, he became the Permanent Secretary of the Ministry of Defence on 10 August 2018. From 2 to 5 April 2019, he represented Brunei during both the ASEAN Defence Senior Officials’ Meeting (ADSOM) and ADSOM-Plus. During the 8th Singapore-Brunei Defence Policy Dialogue (DPD) on 15 September 2020, Shahril co-chaired the meeting through video conference. Permanent Secretary Shahril attended the 10th Meeting of the Deputy Ministers of Defense of the Republic of Korea (ROK)–ASEAN and the Seoul Defense Dialogue (SDD) on 8 September 2021.

Personal life
Shahril Anwar is married to Noraidah binti Haji Ibrahim and has two children together. In addition, he enjoys running and cycling. He attended a MS ABDB association football match during the 2016 Brunei Super League.

Honours

Namesakes 

 Shahril Anwar Loop, road name in Rimba Air Force Base officiated on 22 April 2022.

National 

  Order of Pahlawan Negara Brunei First Class (PSPNB) – Dato Seri Pahlawan (15 July 2016)
  Order of Setia Negara Brunei Fourth Class (PSB)
  Order of Seri Paduka Mahkota Brunei Third Class (SMB) – (19 August 2017)
  Long Service Medal (Armed Forces)
  Golden Jubilee Medal – (5 October 2017)
  Silver Jubilee Medal – (5 October 1992)
  General Service Medal (Armed Forces)
  Royal Brunei Armed Forces Golden Jubilee Medal – (31 May 2011)

Foreign 

 :
  Pingat Jasa Gemilang (PJG) – (27 July 2017)

References

Living people
Bruneian military leaders
Year of birth missing (living people)